Henry Driver (1831–23 Jan 1893) was a 19th-century Member of Parliament from Otago, New Zealand.

He was born in the United States, but as a young man emigrated to Victoria, Australia. When the Otago Gold Rush began in 1861 he established himself as a merchant in Dunedin. Later he joined with John Maclean to form Driver, Maclean & Co., auctioneers.

References

1831 births
1893 deaths
Members of the New Zealand House of Representatives
New Zealand MPs for Dunedin electorates
Unsuccessful candidates in the 1884 New Zealand general election
19th-century New Zealand politicians
American emigrants to New Zealand